The 2011 Tennessee Tech Golden Eagles football team represented Tennessee Technological University as a member of Ohio Valley Conference (OVC) during the 2011 NCAA Division I FCS football season. Led by fifth-year head coach Watson Brown, the Golden Eagles compiled an overall record of 7–4 overall with a mark of 6–2 in conference play, sharing the OVC title with Eastern Kentucky and Jacksonville State. Tennessee Tech received the conference's automatic bid into the NCAA Division I Football Championship playoffs, where they lost in the first round to Central Arkansas. The team played home games at Tucker Stadium in Cookeville, Tennessee.

Schedule

References

Tennessee Tech
Tennessee Tech Golden Eagles football seasons
Ohio Valley Conference football champion seasons
Tennessee Tech
Tennessee Tech Golden Eagles football